Juan Norat Pérez (6 December 1944 – 19 December 2021) was a Spanish professional footballer who played as a midfielder.

Career
Born in Sanxenxo, Norat spent almost his entire career with local club Pontevedra across four levels (in the Primera División, Segunda División, Segunda División B and Tercera División) between 1964 and 1979. His time at Pontevedra was interrupted by a one-season stint at Ourense in the 1970–71 season.

Later life and death
Norat died in Sanxenxo on 19 December 2021, at the age of 77.

References

1944 births
2021 deaths
People from O Salnés
Sportspeople from the Province of Pontevedra
Footballers from Galicia (Spain)
Spanish footballers
Association football midfielders
Pontevedra CF footballers
CD Ourense footballers
La Liga players
Segunda División players
Segunda División B players